Kovongo Mia is a village in the Bamingui-Bangoran Prefecture in the northern Central African Republic. As of October 2020, it is controlled by the Popular Front for the Rebirth of Central African Republic.

Populated places in Bamingui-Bangoran
Bamingui